Mannosyl-oligosaccharide glucosidase is an enzyme that in humans is encoded by the MOGS gene.

Glucosidase I is the first enzyme in the N-linked oligosaccharide processing pathway. GCS1 cleaves the distal alpha-1,2-linked glucose residue from the Glc(3)-Man(9)-GlcNAc(2) oligosaccharide precursor.  GCS1 is located in the lumen of the endoplasmic reticulum.

GCS1 may also refer to "generative cell specific 1", also called HAP2 (hapless2), a gene of lower eukaryotes which is thought to be responsible for gametes fusion .
.

References

Further reading

External links
  GeneReviews/NCBI/NIH/UW entry on Congenital Disorders of Glycosylation Overview